Julio Eduardo Cid Lagos (born January 11, 1983), also known as Julio Eduardo in Indonesia, is a Chilean former footballer who last played for Persipon Pontianak of the Liga Indonesia Premier Division.

Career

In Chile
Cid had stints with Universidad Católica, Deportes Puerto Montt, Curicó Unido, Ñublense, Deportes Valdivia, Huachipato and Colchagua before moving abroad.

Balestier Khalsa

Plying his trade with Balestier Khalsa of the Singapore S.League in 2009, Eduardo suffered an injury while playing for them, forcing him to miss some matches including a 1–4 defeat to Gombak United.  Besides that, the Chilean midfielder participated in the 2009 Singapore League Cup, winning his first S.League game in a 2–1 triumph over Young Lions.

During his time in Singapore, Eduardo was sent off once, when he got two straight yellow cards in a 0–0 tie with Sengkang Punggol.

Persipon Pontianak
Along with Chilean footballer Juan Luis Lillo, Eduardo claimed that Persipon Pontianak owed them eight months' worth of pay. However, when they went to see Edi Rusdi Kamtono, the proprietor of the club, he blatantly stated he did not want to pay them anymore.

References

External links 
 
 

1983 births
Living people
People from Chillán
Chilean footballers
Chilean expatriate footballers
Club Deportivo Universidad Católica footballers
Puerto Montt footballers
Curicó Unido footballers
Ñublense footballers
C.D. Huachipato footballers
Deportes Valdivia footballers
Deportes Colchagua footballers
Balestier Khalsa FC players
Persitara Jakarta Utara players
Chilean Primera División players
Tercera División de Chile players
Singapore Premier League players
Chilean expatriate sportspeople in Singapore
Chilean expatriate sportspeople in Indonesia
Expatriate footballers in Singapore
Expatriate footballers in Indonesia
Association football midfielders